In algebraic geometry, the Witten conjecture is a conjecture about intersection numbers of stable classes on the moduli space of curves, introduced by Edward Witten in the paper , and generalized in . 
Witten's original conjecture was proved by Maxim Kontsevich in the paper . 

Witten's motivation for the conjecture was that two different models of 2-dimensional quantum gravity should have the same partition function. The partition function for one of these models can be described in terms of intersection numbers on the moduli stack of algebraic curves, and the partition function for the other is the logarithm of the τ-function of the KdV hierarchy. Identifying these partition functions gives Witten's conjecture that a certain generating function formed from intersection numbers should satisfy the differential equations of the KdV hierarchy.

Statement

Suppose that Mg,n is the moduli stack of compact Riemann surfaces of genus g with n distinct marked points x1,...,xn, 
and g,n is its Deligne–Mumford compactification. There are n line bundles Li on 
g,n, whose fiber at a point of the moduli stack is given by the cotangent space of a Riemann surface at the marked point xi. The intersection index 〈τd1, ..., τdn〉 is the intersection index of Π c1(Li)di on g,n where Σdi = dimg,n = 3g – 3 + n, and 0 if no such g exists, where c1 is the first Chern class of a line bundle. Witten's generating function

encodes all the intersection indices as its coefficients. 

Witten's  conjecture states that the partition function Z = exp F is a τ-function for the KdV hierarchy, in other words it satisfies a certain series of partial differential equations corresponding to the basis  of the Virasoro algebra.

Proof

Kontsevich used a combinatorial description of the moduli spaces in terms of ribbon graphs to show that 

Here the sum on the right is over the set Gg,n of ribbon graphs X of compact Riemann surfaces of genus g with n marked points.  The set of edges e and points of X are denoted by X 0 and X1. The function λ is thought of as a function from the marked points to the reals, and extended to edges of the ribbon graph by setting λ of an edge equal to the sum of λ at the two marked points corresponding to each side of the edge. 

By Feynman diagram techniques, this implies that 
F(t0,...) is an asymptotic expansion of 

as Λ lends to infinity, where Λ and Χ are positive definite N by N hermitian matrices, and ti is given by

and the probability measure μ on the positive definite hermitian matrices is given by 

where cΛ is a normalizing constant. This measure has the property that

which implies that its expansion in terms of Feynman diagrams is the expression for F in terms of ribbon graphs. 

From this he deduced that exp F is a τ-function for the KdV hierarchy, thus proving Witten's conjecture.

Generalizations

The Witten conjecture is a special case of a more general relation between integrable systems of Hamiltonian PDEs and the geometry of certain families of 2D topological field theories (axiomatized in the form of the so-called cohomological field theories by Kontsevich and Manin), which was explored and studied systematically by B. Dubrovin and Y. Zhang, A. Givental, C. Teleman and others.

The Virasoro conjecture is a generalization of the Witten conjecture.

References

Moduli theory
Algebraic geometry
Conjectures that have been proved